"I Can See Arkansas" is a song recorded by Canadian country music artist Anne Murray. It was released in 1992 as the third single from her album Yes I Do. It peaked at number 9 on the RPM Country Tracks chart in July 1992.

The song was originally recorded by Steve Wariner on his 1990 album Laredo. It was also recorded by David Ball on his 2004 album Freewheeler.

Chart performance

Year-end charts

References

Songs about Arkansas
1990 songs
1992 singles
Anne Murray songs
Liberty Records singles
Songs written by Wood Newton
Song recordings produced by Jerry Crutchfield
Music videos directed by Steven Goldmann
Steve Wariner songs
David Ball (country singer) songs